Iberus gualtieranus is a species of air-breathing land snail, a terrestrial pulmonate gastropod mollusk in the family Helicidae, the typical snails.

Iberus gualtieranus is the type species of the genus Iberus.

This species is endemic to the Iberian Peninsula, Spain.

Subspecies 
Iberus gualtieranus
 Iberus gualtieranus alonensis
 Iberus gualtieranus campesinus
 Iberus gualtieranus carthaginiensis
 Iberus gualtieranus gualterianus
 Iberus gualtieranus mariae
 Iberus gualtieranus posthumus
 Iberus gualtieranus rhodopeplus

Shell description

References 

gualtieranus
Gastropods described in 1758
Taxa named by Carl Linnaeus
Taxonomy articles created by Polbot